Scandix is a genus of flowering plants in the family Apiaceae.

Species
Species include:

 Scandix aegyptiaca
 Scandix affinis
 Scandix apiculata
 Scandix aromatica
 Scandix aucheri
 Scandix aurea
 Scandix australis L.
 Scandix balansae
 Scandix borziana
 Scandix brachycarpa
 Scandix bulbocastanum
 Scandix bulgarica
 Scandix chevalieri
 Scandix chilensis
 Scandix clavata
 Scandix cornuta
 Scandix curvirostris
 Scandix damascena
 Scandix falcata
 Scandix fedtschenkoana
 Scandix fumarioides
 Scandix georgica
 Scandix gilanica
 Scandix glochidiata
 Scandix hirsuta
 Scandix hispanica
 Scandix hispida
 Scandix hispidula
 Scandix iberica M.Bieb.
 Scandix inferta
 Scandix infesta
 Scandix laeta
 Scandix laevigata
 Scandix latifolia
 Scandix manjurkiana
 Scandix millefolia
 Scandix nutans
 Scandix orientalis
 Scandix palaestina
 Scandix parviflora
 Scandix pecten-veneris L.
 Scandix persica
 Scandix petraea
 Scandix pinnatifida
 Scandix pontica
 Scandix radiata
 Scandix rostrata
 Scandix russeliana
 Scandix stella
 Scandix stellata Banks & Sol.
 Scandix stellulata
 Scandix sylvestris
 Scandix taurica
 Scandix tenuifolia
 Scandix tinctoria
 Scandix trichosperma
 Scandix turgida
 Scandix tymphaea
 Scandix wilhelmsii
 Scandix vulgaris

References

Apioideae
Apioideae genera